Gwei Lun-mei (born 25 December 1983) is a Taiwanese actress. She started her acting career in 2002, with the film Blue Gate Crossing. Gwei then appeared in a few more films before achieving wide recognition for the film Secret, directed by Jay Chou, in which Gwei played the character of Lu Hsiao-yu.

In 2012, Gwei starred in Girlfriend, Boyfriend, a coming-of-age drama in which three teenagers navigate their attraction to one another – from their high school years into their adulthood. The film won Gwei a Best Leading Actress award at the 49th Golden Horse Awards.

Personal life
Gwei has been in a long-term relationship with actor and filmmaker Leon Dai since 2004.

Filmography

Film

Television

Music video appearances

Variety and reality show

Discography

Awards and nominations

References

External links

 
 

1983 births
Living people
Taiwanese film actresses
Taiwanese television actresses
21st-century Taiwanese actresses
Tamkang University alumni
Actresses from Taipei